Happy People is the second solo album by Brazilian percussionist Paulinho Da Costa released in 1979, recorded for Pablo Records.

Track listing
"Déjà Vu" (John Barnes, Vella Cameron) – 4:32
"Take It On Up" (Kevin Barnes, Louis Satterfield, Robert Wright, Verdine White) – 3:12
"Love Till The End Of Time" (Greg Phillinganes) – 3:27
"Seeing Is Believing" (John Barnes, Vella Cameron) – 3:58
"Dreamflow" (Larry Carlton) – 3:45
"Carnival Of Colors" (Ivan Lins, Vítor Martins) – 3:28
"Let's Get Together" (Marlo Henderson, Paulinho Da Costa) – 5:41
"Happy People" (Erich Bulling, Paulinho Da Costa) – 4:08
"Put Your Mind On Vacation" (Deborah Thomas, Greg Mathieson) – 5:14

Personnel
Paulinho Da Costa - percussion
John Barnes, Greg Phillinganes - keyboards
Nathan Watts - bass
Al McKay, Larry Carlton, Marlo Henderson - guitars
Michael Boddicker - synthesizers	
James Gadson - drums
Bill Reichenbach Jr., Eric Culver, Tom "Bones" Malone, Lew McCreary, Dick Hyde - trombones
Chuck Findley, Gary Grant, Steve Madaio – trumpets, flugelhorns
Gary Herbig - saxophone, flute, oboe
Philip Bailey (1), Deborah Thomas (6, 9), Bill Champlin (2, 4), Carl Carwell (7) - lead vocals	
Bill Champlin, Carl Carwell, Carmen Twillie, Clarence Ford, Jr., Deborah Thomas, Jeanette Hawes, Philip Bailey, Vennette Cloud - backing vocals

Production
Paulinho Da Costa - Producer
Erich Bulling, John Barnes, Bruce Miller  - Arrangements
Humberto Gatica - Engineer and Mix
Chris Desmond - Engineer (additional) 
Bernie Grundman - Mastering  
Blue Johnson - Photography 
Norman Granz, Sheldon Marks Artwork B - Layout and Design

References

External links
PaulinhoDaCosta at Concord Records
Paulinho Da Costa at Discogs

1979 albums
Paulinho da Costa albums
Pablo Records albums